Jaleel Cousins (born December 1, 1993) is an American professional basketball player. He played college basketball for Navarro College and South Florida.

High school career
Cousins first attended LeFlore Magnet High School in his native Mobile, Alabama, however, he transferred as a senior to Spanish Fort High School. As a senior for the Toros, he was a member of the ASWA All-State Class 5A.

College career
Cousins began his college career at Navarro College, where he averaged 3.7 points and 2.9 rebounds as a freshman and improved those numbers to 7.1 points and 4.8 rebounds per game as a sophomore.

In his junior season, Cousins transferred to South Florida. He averaged 8.5 points, 7.9 rebounds, 1.6 blocks and 25.0 minutes per contest 33 games as a senior.

Professional career

Texas Legends (2016—2017)
After going undrafted in the 2016 NBA draft, Cousins joined the Dallas Mavericks for the 2016 NBA Summer League. On October 17, 2016, he signed with the Mavericks, but was waived five days later. On October 30, 2016, he was acquired by the Texas Legends of the NBA Development League as an affiliate player of the Mavericks. On January 29, 2017, he was waived by the Legends.

Reno Bighorns (2017)
On February 3, 2017, Cousins was acquired by the Reno Bighorns.

Formosa Dreamers (2017)
Cousins was acquired as an import player for the Formosa Dreamers  and debuted in his first ASEAN Basketball League  game on November 18, 2017, in a loss to the CLS Knights.

Santa Cruz Warriors (2018–2019)
For the 2018–19 season, Cousins joined the Santa Cruz Warriors of the NBA G League.

Personal life
He is the son of Monique Cousins and the younger brother of National Basketball Association center DeMarcus Cousins. He majored in communications.

References

External links
South Florida Bulls bio
RealGM profile
Sports-Reference profile

1993 births
Living people
American expatriate basketball people in Taiwan
American men's basketball players
ASEAN Basketball League players
Basketball players from Alabama
Centers (basketball)
Navarro Bulldogs basketball players
Reno Bighorns players
Santa Cruz Warriors players
South Florida Bulls men's basketball players
Sportspeople from Mobile, Alabama
Texas Legends players
Formosa Dreamers players